Love Begins at 20 is a 1936 American comedy film directed by Frank McDonald and written by Dalton Trumbo and Tom Reed, based on the 1929 play Broken Dishes by Martin Flavin. The film stars Hugh Herbert, Patricia Ellis, Warren Hull, Hobart Cavanaugh, Dorothy Vaughan and Clarence Wilson. The film was released by  Warner Bros. on August 22, 1936.

Plot

Cast        
Hugh Herbert as Horatio Gillingwater
Patricia Ellis as Lois Gillingwater
Warren Hull as Jerry Wayne
Hobart Cavanaugh as Jacob 'Jake' Buckley
Dorothy Vaughan as Evalina 'Evie' Gillingwater
Clarence Wilson as Jonathan Ramp
Robert Gleckler as Gangster Mugsy O'Bannion, aka Harold McCauley
Mary Treen as Alice Gillingwater
Anne Nagel as Miss Perkins, Ramp's Secretary
Arthur Aylesworth as Justice Felton
Sol Gorss as Jim, a Bank Robber
Henry Otho as Lumpy, a Bank Robber
Max Wagner as Lester, O'Bannion's Driver
Tom Brower as Sheriff Bert Hanson
Milton Kibbee as Wilbur, Detective 
Tom Wilson as Fred

References

External links 
 

1936 films
Warner Bros. films
American comedy films
1936 comedy films
Films directed by Frank McDonald
American black-and-white films
1930s English-language films
1930s American films